Charr may refer to:

 Certain fish in the genus Salvelinus
 Henri Charr, Assyrian filmmaker
 Manuel Charr (born 1984), Syrian professional boxer
 USS Charr (SS-328), a United States Navy Balao-class submarine

Entertainment 
 Charr (video game), a 1994 Commodore Amiga game
 Charr, a felinoid race in the MMORPG Guild Wars

See also

 Char (disambiguation)
Charl (name)